He Hanbin (born 10 January 1986) is a retired badminton player from China.

Career 
A doubles specialist, He won men's doubles at the Austrian International tourney with Guo Zhendong in 2007. Most of his accomplishments, however, have come in mixed doubles with Yu Yang. They have captured the Asian Championships (2007) together, as well as the Thailand (2007), Denmark (2007), Swiss (2008), Malaysia (2008), and French (2008) Opens. At the 2008 Beijing Olympics He and Yu lost a very close semifinal match to Indonesia's Nova Widianto and Lilyana Natsir, but won an equally close match over another Indonesian pair, Flandy Limpele and Vita Marissa to earn a bronze medal.

Achievements

Olympic Games 
Mixed doubles

BWF World Championships 
Mixed doubles

Asian Games 
Mixed doubles

Asian Championships 
Mixed doubles

World Junior Championships 
Boys' doubles

Mixed doubles

Asian Junior Championships 
Boys' doubles

Mixed doubles

BWF Superseries 
The BWF Superseries, launched on 14 December 2006 and implemented in 2007, is a series of elite badminton tournaments, sanctioned by Badminton World Federation (BWF). BWF Superseries has two level such as Superseries and Superseries Premier. A season of Superseries features twelve tournaments around the world, which introduced since 2011, with successful players invited to the Superseries Finals held at the year end.

Mixed doubles

  Superseries Finals Tournament
  Superseries Premier Tournament
  Superseries Tournament

BWF Grand Prix 
The BWF Grand Prix has two levels, the BWF Grand Prix and Grand Prix Gold. It is a series of badminton tournaments sanctioned by the Badminton World Federation (BWF) since 2007.

Mixed doubles

  BWF Grand Prix Gold tournament
  BWF Grand Prix tournament

BWF International Challenge/Series 
Men's doubles

  BWF International Challenge tournament
  BWF International Series tournament

References

External links 
 
 
 
 

1986 births
Living people
People from Nanchang
Badminton players from Jiangxi
Chinese male badminton players
Badminton players at the 2008 Summer Olympics
Olympic badminton players of China
Olympic bronze medalists for China
Olympic medalists in badminton
Medalists at the 2008 Summer Olympics
Badminton players at the 2010 Asian Games
Asian Games gold medalists for China
Asian Games bronze medalists for China
Asian Games medalists in badminton
Medalists at the 2010 Asian Games
Chinese twins
Twin sportspeople
20th-century Chinese people
21st-century Chinese people